Simon Julen (3 May 1897 – 27 March 1951) was a Swiss cross-country skier. He competed in the men's 50 kilometre event at the 1924 Winter Olympics.

References

External links
 

1897 births
1951 deaths
Swiss male cross-country skiers
Olympic cross-country skiers of Switzerland
Cross-country skiers at the 1924 Winter Olympics
People from Zermatt
Sportspeople from Valais
20th-century Swiss people